Cameo Theatre is an American anthology series that aired on NBC during the Golden Age of Television, from 1950 to 1955.

Television in the round
The live series, produced by Albert McCleery, introduced to television the concept of theater-in-the-round, which had been well established and popularized since 1947 by Margo Jones with her Theatre '47 in Dallas, Texas. McCleery's method of staging employed minimal sets and props well lit within a black background, enabling cameras to move about with much freedom in the darkness, picking up shots from any angle. McCleery's skill with this type of staging led directly to his producer role with NBC's Matinee Theatre. The technique put the focus directly on the characters and dialogue rather than scenery.

Jim Buckley of the Pewter Plough Playhouse (Cambria, California) recalled:
When Al McCleery got back to the States, he originated a most ambitious theatrical TV series for NBC called Matinee Theatre: to televise five different stage plays per week live, airing around noon in order to promote color TV (which had just been developed) to the American housewife as she labored over her ironing. Al was the producer. He hired five directors and five art directors. Richard Bennett, one of our first early presidents of the Pewter Plough Corporation, was one of the directors and I was one of the art directors and, as soon as we were through televising one play, we had lunch and then met to plan next week’s show. That was over 50 years ago, and I’m trying to think; I believe the TV art director is (or was) his own set decorator (selecting furnishings and hand props)—yes, of course! It had to be, since one of McCleery’s chief claims to favor with the producers was his elimination of the setting per se and simply decorating the scene with a minimum of props. It took a bit of ingenuity.

Story sources
Cameo Theatre featured adaptations from the short stories of Roald Dahl, Shirley Jackson, Irwin Shaw, and others. The Paley Center for Media detailed the scripting contribution of Ellen M. Violett:
Her first teleplay to be produced was an adaptation of Shirley Jackson’s "short shocker", "The Lottery" for NBC’s sustaining Cameo Theatre in 1950. Created and produced by Albert McCleery, Cameo Theatre was, as described by Tim Brooks and Earle Marsh in The Complete Directory to Prime Time Network and Cable TV Shows, 1946 to Present, “An interesting early experiment in the unique dramatic possibilities of television… produced in the round, using a minimum of props. It made considerable use of closeups and other camera techniques to focus attention on the characterizations of individual actors. High quality scripts were used, both originals and adaptations for television.” Broadcast on June 14, 1950, Violett’s adaptation of “The Lottery” was the fifth episode of Cameo Theatre, and helped McCleery establish his reputation as a television innovator with his Cameo “technique” of no scenery. “The Lottery” episode was awarded the Single Program Award by the National Conference for Community and Justice, for “promotion of mutual tolerance between people of different races and religions,” and thereby caused quite a stir in the middle of the era of blacklisting, especially as it was the subject of articles in both Time and Life magazines. “Without scenery, well-known actors or advance fanfare,” wrote Time in its issue dated June 26, 1950, “Cameo Theater… last week presented one of the most exciting plays ever shown on U.S. television.” Violett’s teleplay was produced again on August 31, 1951, as an episode of Fireside Theatre, starring Margaret Hayes.

Cameo Theatre was notable for developing young writers. Scripter Raphael Hayes recalled entering broadcasting after he left the Army:
I came out and got a job in the WNEW radio station in New York, as what we called a continuity writer, which paid enough, I suppose, to eat.  And at that time television was beginning, and I figured why not try it and see what I could do. I had a little story in my head and I wrote it. You know the phrase “throw it over the transom?”  That’s what I did–to the slush pile over at NBC. “A Little Night Music,” it was called, and I think it was a Cameo Theatre. And, my God, the telephone rang one day when I was working at WNEW, and I picked up the phone and listened very carefully, and she said, “We want to do your script.” I was stunned.  I hung up, and everybody else in the office looked at me with vengeance. That’s where it began, professionally, where I was able to make some money out of the craft. After that happened, I began to figure out that if I did one television script a month, and they paid me at least $500 for that month, I could quit this job and live that way, doing one script a month for things like Cameo Theatre and other things that were around.

Guest stars
Ed Begley
Constance Bennett
Richard Carlson (actor)
Angie Dickinson
James Drury
Nina Foch
June Havoc
Claire Luce
Douglass Montgomery
Mildred Natwick
Judy Parrish
Ernest Truex
Sam Wanamaker

Summer replacements
NBC carried the series as a replacement show four times: It was telecast from June to August 1950 as a summer replacement for the second half-hour of Four Star Revue. In 1951, it was broadcast as a June to August replacement for The Voice of Firestone. It replaced Leave It to the Girls from January to April 1952. The series concluded in 1955 as a summer replacement (July to August) for Letter to Loretta.

Each episode ended with McCleery's trademark closing tag, a hand holding chalk and writing "Albert McCleery" on a blackboard. The hand, however, was not McCleery's; although realistic in appearance, it was actually a mannequin hand holding the chalk.

Episodes
May 30, 1950 - "The Long Walk" - Richard Carlyle, Patricia Breslin

References

External links
Cameo Theatre at CVTA with list of episodes

1950 American television series debuts
1950s American anthology television series
1955 American television series endings
American live television series
1950s American drama television series
NBC original programming